Daniel Chanan Matt is an author, teacher and scholar of Kabbalah. He received his Ph.D. from Brandeis University and served as a professor at the Graduate Theological Union in Berkeley from 1979-2000. He has also taught at Stanford University and the Hebrew University of Jerusalem. Matt is best known for his multi-volume annotated translation, The Zohar: Pritzker Edition. He composed the first nine volumes of this twelve-volume series (covering the Zohar's main commentary on the Torah), and was the General Editor of the remaining three volumes (covering other sections of the Zohar). His annotated translation has been hailed as "a monumental contribution to the history of Jewish thought." He currently teaches Zohar online.

Publications (partial list)
 Daniel C. Matt, trans. and ed., The Zohar: Pritzker Edition, 9 vols. Stanford: Stanford University Press, 2004–2016.
Daniel C. Matt, The Essential Kabbalah: The Heart of Jewish Mysticism, New York: HarperCollins, 1995.
 Daniel C. Matt, God & the Big Bang: Discovering Harmony Between Science and Spirituality, Woodstock, Vt.: Jewish Lights, 1996; 2nd ed., 2016.
 Daniel C. Matt, Becoming Elijah: Prophet of Transformation. New Haven: Yale University Press, 2022 (Jewish Lives series).
 Daniel C. Matt, Zohar: Annotated and Explained. Woodstock, Vt.: SkyLights Paths, 2002. (Selections)
 Daniel Chanan Matt, Zohar: The Book of Enlightenment. New York: Paulist Press, 1983. (Selections)
 Daniel C. Matt, ed. Walking Humbly with God: The Life and Writings of Rabbi Hershel Jonah Matt, Hoboken, New Jersey: Ktav, 1993.

Awards 

 2004: National Jewish Book Award for The Zohar: Pritzker Edition
 2004: Koret Jewish Book Award for The Zohar: Pritzker Edition
 2022: Rabbi Jonathan Sacks Book Prize for Becoming Elijah: Prophet of Transformation

References

External links
 "Zohar: The Pritzker edition" project homepage
 "Finding my religion", an article by David Ian Miller
 Daniel Matt, lecture at UCSB, video recording
 Daniel Matt, interviewed by Orthodox Rabbi Shmuly Yanklowitz, video recording
 Sample video recordings of Daniel Matt's online Zohar Course
 Daniel Matt's online Zohar Course (one in English and one in the original Aramaic) 
 Daniel Matt's website

Year of birth missing (living people)
Hebrew–English translators
Jewish mysticism
Kabbalah texts
Living people
Translators from Aramaic